John Arthur Jarvis (24 February 1872 – 9 May 1933) was an English competitive swimmer who represented Great Britain in three Olympic Games, and was a well-known amateur athlete of the late 19th century and early 20th century.  He participated in Swimming at the 1900 Summer Olympics in Paris and won two gold medals in the 1000-metre and the 4000-metre freestyle events. He also won a gold medal in the water polo tournament.

Jarvis was born in Leicester. He was inducted into the International Swimming Hall of Fame as an "Honor Swimmer" in 1968.

See also
 Great Britain men's Olympic water polo team records and statistics
 List of Olympic medalists in swimming (men)
 List of Olympic medalists in water polo (men)
 List of Olympic champions in men's water polo
 List of members of the International Swimming Hall of Fame

References

External links
 
 

1933 deaths
1872 births
English male freestyle swimmers
Male long-distance swimmers
English Olympic medallists
Olympic gold medallists for Great Britain
Olympic swimmers of Great Britain
Sportspeople from Leicester
Swimmers at the 1900 Summer Olympics
Swimmers at the 1906 Intercalated Games
Swimmers at the 1908 Summer Olympics
Medalists at the 1900 Summer Olympics
Medalists at the 1906 Intercalated Games
Water polo players at the 1900 Summer Olympics
Olympic gold medalists in swimming
British male backstroke swimmers